J. C. Martin may refer to:
 J. C. Martin (baseball), Major League Baseball player
 J. C. Martin (Texas politician), mayor of Laredo, Texas